Kannadasan (24 June 1927 – 17 October 1981) was an Indian philosopher, poet, film song lyricist, producer, actor, script-writer, editor, philanthropist, and is heralded as one of the greatest and most important lyricists in India. Frequently called Kaviarasu, With over 5000 lyrics, 6000 poems and 232 books, Kannadasan is widely known by the sobriquet Kaviarasu (King of poets) and he is also considered to be the greatest modern Tamil poet after Subramania Bharati. including novels, epics, plays, essays, his most popular being the 10-part religious book on Hinduism, Arthamulla Indhu Matham (Meaningful Hindu Religion). He won the Sahitya Akademi Award for his novel Cheraman Kathali in the year 1980 and was the first to receive the National Film Award for Best Lyrics, given in 1969 for the film Kuzhanthaikkaga.

Personal life 
Kannadasan was born to Sathappan Chettiar and Visalakshi Aachi in a Nattukottai Nagarathar family in Sirukoodalpatti, near Karaikudi, Tamil Nadu and was given the birth name Muthiah. He was the eighth of ten children to his parents. He was adopted by Chigappi Aachi for a sum of INR 7000 at an early age, who brought him up and was responsible for his early stages of school education. He completed his schooling till the 8th standard in Sirukudalpatti and Amaravathipudhur. He worked for a private company in Tiruvottiyur before taking up an editorial post in a Tamil Magazine where for the first time he took up the pseudonym Kannadasan. He died on October 17, 1981.

Religious views
Muthiaah was a keen follower of the Dravidian atheistic movement. He had great love of Tamil language and its culture, and excelled in Tamil literature, both prose and poetry. He read the Thiruppaavai of Aandaal, and was amazed at its mystic poetry, which had a deep and lasting impact on him. After a lot of introspection, he decided to go back to Hinduism. He renamed himself as Kannadaasan, meaning the servant of Lord Krishna (In Tamil, Kannan means Krishna and in Sanskrit, daasa means servant'. He dug deep into understanding Hinduism, and wrote his series of books on Hinduism titled Arthamulla Indhu Matham. .

Songwriting
Kannadasan's greatest contribution to Tamil culture is his songwriting. Before Kannadasan, many lyricists like Papanasam Sivan, Kambadasan, Vindhan, A. Maruthakasi, and Ku. Ma. Balasubramaniam were sought after in the Tamil music industry, but after the advent of Kannadasan, the scene changed. He quickly became the most sought-after lyricist in the industry and remained so until his death. Kannadasan was so popular that some songs written by other contemporary poets were considered to be written by Kannadhasan. Though, film lyrics have come a long way since his death, many people still consider Kannadasan to be the best songwriter. He is considered to be the greatest modern Tamil poet after Subramanya Bharathi.

He was the producer of the historic Tamil film Sivagangai Seemai portraying Marudhu Pandaiars, one of the pioneers in the Indian freedom struggle.  The song "Santhupottu" from that film remains popular.

Spiritual books

 Arthamulla Indhu Matham
 Yesu Kaviyam
 Bagavath geethai
 Ponmazhai
 Bajagovindam
 Sri Krishna Kavasam
 Sri Venkatesa Suprabatham - Andal Thirupaavai
 Ambigai Alagu Dharisanam
 Krishna Anthathi
 Sankara Pokisham

Notable novels

 Cheraman kathali 
 Aval oru hindhu pen 
 Sivappukal mukkuththi
 Ratha pushpangal
 Avalukakga oru padal
 Swarna saraswathi
 Nadantha kathai
 Misa 
 Suruthi seratha rakangal
 Mupadhu naalum pournami
 Arangamum antharangamum
 Kadal konda thennadu
 Ayiram thivu angkayarkanni
 Kamini kanchana
 Kutti kathaigal
 Oru kavinani kathai
 Velangkudi thiruvila
 Ayiramkal mandapam
 Birundhavanam 
 Aachi
 Vilaku matuma sivapu 
 Aathanathu aathimanthi
 Anarkalai
 Athaivida ragasiyam
 Paarimalai kodi
 Oru Nathiyin kathai
 Sembagathaman kathai
 Manampola vaalvu
 Sivakangai seemai
 Santhithen sinthithen
 Oomaiyin Kottai
 Sarasuvin soundarya lagari
 Artham ulla indhu matham

Poetry

 Mutruperatha Kaviyangal
 Sri krishna anthathi
 Ambigai alagu dharisanam
 Maangani
 Paadi kudutha mangalam
 Thaipaavai
 Kannadhasan Kavithaigal Parts 1-7
 Yesu Kaaviyam
 Pon Mazhai

Autobiography 
 Enathu Suyasaritham.
 Enathu Vasantha Kaalangal.
 Vanavasam.
 Manavasam.
 Naan Partha Arasiyal.

Selected filmography

Lyrics
 Singari
 Aayirathil oruvan
 Mannadhi Mannan
 Thaai Sollai Thattadhe
 Thaayai Kaatha Thanayan
 Paasam
 Karuppu Panam
 Panathottam
 Paava Mannippu
 Periya Idathu Penn
 Dharmam Thalai Kaakkum
 Anandha Jodhi
 Needhikkuppin Paasam
 Kudumba Thalaivan
 Kaanchi Thalaivan
 Parisu
 Vettaikaaran
 Panakkara Kudumbam
 Palum Pazhamum
 Thiruvilayadal
 Saraswathi Sabatham
 Pattikada Pattanama
 Urimaikural
 En Kadamai
 Nadodi
 Thanga Pathakkam
 Lakshmi Kalyanam
 Paasa Malar
 Moondram Pirai
 Iruvar Ullam
 Dheerga Sumangali
 Aalayam
 Annai
 Kunkhumam
 Naanum Oru Penn
 Pazhani
 Varumayin Niram Sivappu
 Billa
 Thee
 Deiva Magan
 Kalathur Kannamma
 Paarthaal Pasi Theerum
 Paadha Kaanikkai
 Annai Velankanni
 Thillu Mullu 1981

As actor, writer and producer

Poet laureate

Kannadasan was the poet laureate of the Tamil Nadu government at the time of his death. He wrote two notable autobiographies, titled Vanavasam, a book about his past life whilst he was atheist, with the Dravida Munnetra Kazhagam and a sequel, titled Manavasam a book about his life after he had left DMK.

Contribution to Tamil literature
Kannadasan was a prolific writer and his writing covered a variety of forms- poems, novels, lyrics for Tamil films and books on spirituality. His series titled Arthamulla Indhu Matham (Meaningful Hindu Religion) is known for its simplicity in explaining the principles of Hinduism. Many of Kannadasan's poems have been translated into French. He wrote and published several volumes of poetry. He was an admirer of Kambar, and wrote a number of poems praising Kambar's artistry, contrary to the satire ("Kambarasam") on the same by C.N. Annadurai. He also spoke at several of the Kambar festivals. He sang the beauty of Sita's gait and the shoulders of Rama; he spoke of beauty intoxicating and dropped me in a vessel of amrut (nectar)" This is one of Kannadasan's tribute to the poet Kambar.

Death
Kannadasan died on 17 October 1981 in Chicago, United States, where he had gone from India to attend a Tamil conference organized by the Tamil Association of Chicago. He was aged 54 at the time of his death. The song "Kanne Kalaimane" from the film 'Moondram Pirai', released a few months later, was his last song.

Legacy
The Government of Tamil Nadu built a memorial hall as "Kaviarasar Kannadasan Manimandapam" at Karaikudi. The road adjoining Natesan Park in T. Nagar, Chennai was previously called as Hensman Road is where Kannadasan resided from 1958 and it was renamed "Kannadasan street" in his honour after his demise. It was in this house where 7 Chief Ministers from M. Bhaktavatsalam to J. Jayalalithaa had visited Kannadasan. Kannadhasan once owned 14 cars which were parked on either side of the road in front of house and the last remaining one which was given by K. Kamaraj is still at display in this very house.

See also
 List of Indian writers

References

External links
 
 Gandhi Kannadasan Talks About Kannadasan. 1 August 2018. Vikatan.
 A Poet Turned Politician Kannadasan. Vikatan.

1927 births
1981 deaths
20th-century Indian male writers
20th-century Indian poets
Best Lyrics National Film Award winners
Tamil-language lyricists
Hindu poets
Indian lyricists
Indian male poets
Poets from Tamil Nadu
Tamil film poets
Recipients of the Sahitya Akademi Award in Tamil